Olga is a 2021 Swiss sports drama film directed by Elie Grappe. It was selected as the Swiss entry for the Best International Feature Film at the 94th Academy Awards.

Plot
While in exile in Switzerland, a 15-year-old Ukrainian gymnast prepares for the European Gymnastics Championships when Euromaidan protests begin in Kyiv.

Cast
 Anastasia Budiashkina as Olga
 Sabrina Rubtsova

Awards
The film won the prize for Best Screenplay at the 74th International Critics Week. The film also won the Best Feature Film, the Best Screenplay and the Best Sound at 2022 Swiss Film Awards.

See also
 List of submissions to the 94th Academy Awards for Best International Feature Film
 List of Swiss submissions for the Academy Award for Best International Feature Film

References

External links
 

2021 films
2021 drama films
2020s French-language films
Swiss drama films

2020s sports films
2020s sports drama films